Tellervo is the Finnish goddess of forests. She was the daughter of Tapio, an East Finnish forest spirit.

Finnish goddesses
Nature goddesses
Characters in the Kalevala